Marvin Lee Rittmüller (born 7 March 1999) is a German footballer who plays as a defender for 1. FC Heidenheim.

Career
Rittmüller made his professional debut for 1. FC Heidenheim in the 2. Bundesliga on 27 September 2020, coming on as a substitute in the 57th minute for Florian Pick against FC St. Pauli, with the away match finishing as a 2–4 loss.

References

External links
 
 
 
 

1999 births
Living people
Sportspeople from Erfurt
Footballers from Thuringia
German footballers
Germany youth international footballers
Association football defenders
1. FC Köln II players
1. FC Heidenheim players
2. Bundesliga players
Regionalliga players